Brune Park Community School is a coeducational secondary school on Military Road, Gosport, Hampshire, England.

History 
The name comes from the Prideaux-Brune family who donated the land on which the school is built to the local education authority for the purpose of establishing a school. The school's crest is based on the Prideaux-Brune coat of arms, and the motto is toujours prêt (always ready).

The school was opened at its current location in 1965, amalgamating the existing Central School with the Grove Boys' and Girls' Secondary Modern Schools.

Its sixth form was removed in 1987, and replaced by the nearby sixth form colleges St Vincent College and Fareham College.

The Office for Standards in Education, Children's Services and Skills (Ofsted) rated the school as 'inadequate' in June 2016. following this report, Ofsted placed the school in special measures, In 2017, the school was converted to an academy under the Gosport and Fareham Multi-Academy Trust.

References

External links
 
 The school's Ofsted report page

1965 establishments in England
Secondary schools in Hampshire
Educational institutions established in 1965
Gosport
Academies in Hampshire